Czar  is an unincorporated community in Randolph County, West Virginia, United States, near the Upshur County line.

The origin of the name "Czar" is obscure. The name may be a corruption of the given name Zar.

References

Unincorporated communities in Randolph County, West Virginia
Unincorporated communities in West Virginia